The University of Wollongong in Dubai (UOWD) ) is an offshore campus of the University of Wollongong in Dubai, United Arab Emirates. Established in 1993, the university is located in the Dubai Knowledge Park and serves over 3,500 students from more than 108 countries.

Unlike other foreign universities in the UAE, the University of Wollongong in Dubai is an autonomous and separate entity. While affiliated to the University of Wollongong in Australia, it remains a distinct university that is independent from the mother institution.

History
In 1993, the University of Wollongong in Australia opened what was to become the University of Wollongong in Dubai in the United Arab Emirates. Initially called the Institute of Australian Studies (IAS), this centre made UOW the first foreign university to open a campus in the UAE, and the first Australian tertiary institution represented in the GCC. IAS initially offered English language programs, before becoming a 'feeder college' by 1995, where students completed part of a degree in Business or IT in Dubai before moving to Australia to complete their studies. In 1999, it was the first foreign-owned institution in the world to be issued a licence from the Federal Government of the United Arab Emirates, and was formally opened as University of Wollongong, Dubai Campus in October 2000. It was officially incorporated as University of Wollongong in Dubai in 2004.

Campus
The UOW Dubai Campus is located in Dubai. The Campus is situated at the UOWD building in Dubai Knowledge Village, an educational free-trade zones campus in the city of Dubai that provides facilities for training and learning institutions. In addition to the administrative building, the library, the university campus includes the faculties, student lounge, Multipurpose Room and the Food Court that houses many different restaurants (the Food court is a common eating area for the entire Dubai Knowledge Village).

The Campus offers Residential Services to students, allowing them to live together in a unique multi-cultural environment conducive to academic success, personal growth, and social development. The Residences are located in Jebel Ali Gardens (approximately 15 minutes by bus from Dubai Knowledge Village).

Accreditation
All UOWD undergraduate and postgraduate degrees are accredited by the UAE Ministry of Higher Education and Scientific Research (UAE) (Commission for Academic Accreditation). They are also audited by the Tertiary Education Quality and Standards Agency (TEQSA) of Australia. Certain programs are also quality accredited by international bodies like ACCA, CIM, CIMA, CILT, CIPS etc.

See also
 University of Wollongong
List of universities and colleges in the United Arab Emirates

References

External links
 

Universities and colleges in Dubai
University of Wollongong
Educational institutions established in 1993
Private universities and colleges in the United Arab Emirates
Dubai Knowledge Village
1993 establishments in the United Arab Emirates